Nuclear Evolution: The Age of Love is the second studio album by American hip hop group Sa-Ra Creative Partners. It was released via Ubiquity Records on June 23, 2009. The Wire listed it as one of the "Top 50 Releases of the Year".

Track listing

References

External links
 

2009 albums
Ubiquity Records albums
Sa-Ra albums
Albums produced by Sa-Ra